Western Horseman, a monthly magazine published by the magazine division of Morris Communications, was first published in January 1936. It features articles on Western riding, the breeding and care of horses, horse training and tack, and ranching. It is the category leader in equine publishing and is known as "The World's Leading Horse Magazine Since 1936," and as "America's Favorite Horse Magazine Since 1936."

History and profile
Western Horseman was first published in Lafayette, California in January 1936. The founder was Paul Albert. The magazine was acquired by John Ben Snow in 1943. It was relocated to Colorado Springs, Colorado, in 1948. The magazine was acquired by the Morris Communications in 2001. In February 2010 the headquarters of the magazine moved from Colorado Springs, Colorado, to Fort Worth, Texas, after 62 years.

Western Horseman features articles on Western riding, the breeding and care of horses, horse training and tack, and ranching. 

In May 2011, Randy Witte published a book about Western Horseman, entitled History of Western Horseman.

References

External links
 Western Horseman

Equine magazines
Horses in the United States
Magazines established in 1936
Magazines published in California
Magazines published in Colorado
Magazines published in Texas
Mass media in Colorado Springs, Colorado
Monthly magazines published in the United States
Morris Communications